Mumias West is a constituency in Kenya. It is one of twelve constituencies in Kakamega County. Mumias West Sub County has an approximate population of 111862, with an approximate area of 165.3 square km. There are four wards in Mumias West namely: Mumias central, Mumias North, Etenje, and Musanda. 

The current member of parliament of Mumias West sub county is Hon. Naicca, Johnson Manya who has been on the seat from the year 2013 upto date on the ODM party ticket.

References 

Constituencies in Kakamega County